Linwood is both a surname and a given name. Notable people with the name include:

Surname:
Alec Linwood (1920–2003), Scottish footballer
Elliott Linwood (born 1956), American artist
Mary Linwood (1755–1845), British needle woman
Paul Linwood (born 1983), English footballer
Sonja Kristina Linwood (born 1949), English singer

Given name:
Linwood Barclay (born 1955), Canadian-American humourist, author and columnist
Linwood Boomer (born 1955), Canadian-American television producer, writer, and actor
Linwood Earl Briley (died 1984), American murderer
Linwood Vrooman Carter or Lin Carter (1930–1988), American author
Linwood Clark (1876–1965), American politician
Linwood G. Dunn (1904–1998), American cinematographer and special effects artist
Linwood Murrow, fictional character in the Angel TV series
Linwood Pendleton (born 1964), American environmental economist
Linwood H. Rose (born 1951), American university president

See also
Lynn Faulds Wood

English-language surnames